The water polo events at the 2007 World Aquatics Championships were held from 19 March to 1 April 2007, in Melbourne, Australia.

Medal summary

Medal table

Medalists

References

 
2007
World Aquatics Championships
Water polo